Yu is the pinyin romanisation of several Chinese family names. However, in the Wade–Giles romanisation system, Yu is equivalent to You in pinyin. "Yu" may represent many different Chinese characters, including 余, 于, 由, 魚 (鱼), 漁, 渔, 楀, 俞, 喻, 兪, 於, 遇, 虞, 郁, 尉, 禹, 游, 尤, 庾, 娛, 娱, and 茹.

The most common of the Yu surnames are 于, 余, and 俞. In China, 0.62% of the population have the family name 于 in 2002 (about 7.4 million), and this surname is most common in Shandong province and northeastern China. Around 0.41% of the population have the surname 余 in 2002 (over five million), and it is most common in Jiangxi, Zhejiang and Fujian provinces. The 俞 surname represents around 0.12% of China's population.

Historical figures
 Charles Yu Hsingling, late-Qing and Republican-era diplomat and engineer
 Yu Di, official and Chancellor of the Tang dynasty
 Yu Fan, official of Eastern Wu
 Yu Jin, general under warlord Cao Cao
 John Yu Shuinling, late-Qing and Republican-era diplomat and photographer
 Lizzie Yu Der Ling, late-Qing and Republican-era writer
 Nellie Yu Roung Ling, late-Qing and Republican-era modern dancer and fashion designer

Modern figures
 Yok Mu-ming, Chairman of the New Party
 Derek Yu, video game designer

Lists of people by surname